Vestvik Church is a parish church of the Church of Norway in Inderøy municipality in Trøndelag county, Norway.  It is located in the village of Framverran.  It is one of the two churches for the Mosvik parish which is part of the Stiklestad prosti (deanery) in the Diocese of Nidaros. The white, wooden church was built in a long church style using plans drawn up by the architect Jon Rostad. The church seats about 275 people.

History
The earliest existing historical records of the church date back to the year 1533, but it was much older than that. The baptismal font in the church has been dated to around the year 1250, so it is likely that the church was founded around that time. Not much is known about the old church.

The old church was torn down in 1823 and a new church was constructed on the same site over the next year. The new building was a long church and it was consecrated in 1825. It is not known who designed the building, but it may have been the owner of the church, Jon Rostad. The church was only in use for about 80 years because soon after its construction, the soft clay soil led to instability in the foundation. The new wooden church was constructed in 1905 in a long church style using materials from the previous church building. The new church was designed to look just like the previous church building and Ole Røising was the lead builder. The church was consecrated on 3 November 1905.

Media gallery

See also
List of churches in Nidaros

References

Inderøy
Churches in Trøndelag
Long churches in Norway
Wooden churches in Norway
20th-century Church of Norway church buildings
Churches completed in 1905
13th-century establishments in Norway